The 1988 United States Senate election in Nebraska was held on November 8, 1988 to select the U.S. Senator from the state. Republican U.S. Senator David Karnes decided to seek election to his first full term after being appointed to the seat of the late Edward Zorinsky in March 1987, but was overwhelmingly defeated by former governor Bob Kerrey in the November general election.

Candidates

Democratic 
 Bob Kerrey – Governor of Nebraska (1983–1987)

New Alliance 
 Ernie Chambers – Nebraska State Senator since 1971.

Republican 
 David Karnes – Incumbent U.S. Senator since 1987.
 Hal Daub – Congressman from the second district.

Republican Primary

Results

See also 
  1988 United States Senate elections

References 

1988 Nebraska elections
Nebraska
1988